Beatrice Ancillotti Goretti (1879–1937) was an Italian artist who painted in the Renaissance tradition.

Family 
Beatrice Caterina Enrichetta Ancillotti Goretti was born in Florence in 1879 into a family of impassioned liberals. Her maternal grandfather Demetrio Corgialegno (1785–1861), who had settled in Florence, came from an old and rich Byzantine noble family. He fought alongside the poet, Lord George Byron, during the Greek war of independence. He established a secret organisation aimed at overthrowing Ottoman rule based in both Corfu and his home town, Argostoli. Later, between 1838 and 1842, owing to his Tuscan connections, the Grand Duke of Tuscany, Leopoldo II, gifted to him large quantities of books for the newly founded University of Athens.

In 1871 Goretti's future father, Torello Ancillotti (1843–1899)  married her mother Marianna Coriaglegno,  known in the family as Demetria or Memi, with whom he would have two other children,  Luisa, who died aged nine,  and Demetrio apart from Beatrice. Torello Ancillotti  had met his wife through his friend and the son of Demetrio Corgialegno, Carlo, when, in 1859, they had both joined Giuseppe Garibaldi during Italy's Third War of Independence. Awarded a silver medal for bravery during the conflict, when he returned to Florence, he was employed by  the National Library of Florence. As a youth, he had studied at both the Accademia di Belle Arti di Firenze and that of Siena. He continued to paint, influenced greatly by the  Macchiaioli, and in 1876 and 1877 held exhibitions in both Genoa and Turin.

Leaving his family behind in Florence, in 1877, Torello Ancillotti moved to Rouen in France where, during a liaison with the Countess of Barr, he began an intense and successful period of artistic activity as a painter, water colourist and sculptor.

Relationship with painter Giovanni Costetti
Following in her father's footsteps, Goretti attended the Accademia di Belle Arti in Florence before taking advanced classes at Giovanni Fattori's Free School of the Nude. It was there that she probably met and started a love affair with fellow student and artist, Giovanni Costetti (1878–1949).  He painted a portrait of her entitled The Good Smile  found in the Modern Art Gallery of the Pitti Palace in Florence. In 1899, she also painted a portrait of him that hangs in the same gallery.

In 1901, both artists took part in the 1901 Alinari Divine Comedy Competition, which involved preparing new illustrations for Dante's epic poem The Divine Comedy.

In 1903 Cosetti challenged a rival artist, Augusto Mussini (1870–1919) to a duel because he had become infatuated with Goretti. When Mussini disappeared from the city, he was feared dead. Instead, he had escaped from Florence to take refuge in a monastery in the north of Italy where he became a monk, although he never pronounced his final vows.

That same year, Costetti reported two of Goretti's aunts to the police accusing them of keeping her a recluse. Before leaving Florence after she had ended the affair, she made a statement before a public notary in which she said she had, of her own free will, refused to marry Costetti and strongly denied the rumor that she had been forced into seclusion by her relatives declaring "I am an adult and no one can impose their will on me".

Artistic legacy
Following her departure from Florence, she settled at Stellata, in the province of Ferrara. Here she met Andrea Goretti, whom she married in Fiesole soon after, on 22 February 1904. This was the same year she painted her Self Portrait which is amongst the 170 watercolors, pastels, and pencil drawings  bequeathed by her only daughter Maria Sara Goretti to the Modern Art Collection.

Additional vocations
During World War I she worked as a nurse tending the wounded and the dying; that in 1925, she became a Quaker entering the Society of Friends of London; and that, in 1932, she was a registered member of the Italian Trade Union of  Women Professional Artists.

In 1937 Goretti, aged 58, died in Pistoia, a town about 35 kilometers north west of Florence.

Bibliography
Giovanna Delcorno, Maria Sara Goretti, la sua vita, i suoi libri, «L'Archiginnasio», C (2005), pp. 519–540
Patrizia Busi, Le carte di Maria Sara Goretti, «L'Archiginnasio», C (2005), pp. 541–566.
Giovanna Delcorno and Patrizia Busi, Aeropoesia futurista e pedagogia : i libri e le carte di Maria Sara Goretti alla Biblioteca dell'Archiginnasio, [S.l.: s.n., 2005?], pp. 520–566 : ill.; 24 cm. (Estr. da: L'Archiginnsio, 100 (2005)
Jane Fortune, Invisible Women: Forgotten Artists of Florence, Florence, The Florentine Press, 2009, 
Maddalena Paola Winspeare, Donne & Colori: Artiste Nei Musei Statali Fiorentini – Women & Colours Women Artists in the Florentine State Museums, 2002,  Sillabe, 2002,

References

1879 births
1937 deaths
Italian women painters
Painters from Florence
19th-century Italian painters
19th-century Italian women artists
20th-century Italian painters
20th-century Italian women artists